Puerto Santo Tomás is a coastal village in the Ensenada Municipality of Baja California, Mexico. Site of Jack Clifford Smith's leased house and scene of his novel God And Mr. Gomez.

References 

 OpenStreetMap. Node: Puerto Santo Tomás (2660505462). Date accessed November 6, 2021. Retrieved from https://www.openstreetmap.org.
Kramer, Jennifer. 2020. Moon Baja: Tijuana to Los Cabos. Avalon Publishing.
Allison, Edwin C. 1953. Middle Cretaceous faunas of Puerto Santo Tomás, Baja California, Mexico. University of California, Berkeley.
Garcia Acosta, Marcial. 1966. Geology of the Bahia Soledad Embayment, Baja California, Mexico. San Diego State College.
Niemann, Greg. 1939. Baja Legends: The Historic Characters, Events, and Locations That Put Baja on the Map. Sunbelt Publications, Inc.
 Smith, Jack. January 15, 1987. Man, as ‘a shaper of the landscape,’ paints a rusted iron window grille. Los Angeles Times.
 Niemann, Greg. Mr. Smith In Baja. Date accessed November 6, 2021. Retrieved from https://www.bajabound.com.

Cities in Ensenada Municipality